Renée Groeneveld (born 21 September 1986 in Haarlem) is a sailor from the Netherlands. Groeneveld represented her country at the 2012 Summer Olympics in Weymouth. With fellow crew members Annemieke Bes and Marcelien Bos-de Koning, Groeneveld as helmsman took 8th place in the Elliott 6m match race event.

Sailing career
In 2007 a team was formed of nine sailors, among them were Mandy Mulder, Annemieke Bes, Merel Witteveen, Renée Groeneveld, Marije Faber, Marije Kampen and Brechtje van der Werf), that aimed to qualify for the Olympics in the Yngling class. Groeneveld did not maka the 2008 selection but made a comeback for the 2012 Games.

References

Further reading

External links 
 
 
 

1986 births
Living people
Dutch female sailors (sport)
Olympic sailors of the Netherlands
Sailors at the 2012 Summer Olympics – Elliott 6m
Yngling class sailors
Sportspeople from Haarlem
20th-century Dutch women
21st-century Dutch women